T. gigas  may refer to:
 Tachypleus gigas, an Asian species of horseshoe crab
Thamnophis gigas, the giant garter snake, a reptile of the western United States
 Thesprotia gigas, the grass mantis, a praying mantis species found in Brazil
 Tridacna gigas, the giant clam or pa’ua, the largest living bivalve mollusk species

See also
 Gigas (disambiguation)